The 1992 United States Senate election in Iowa was held November 3, 1992. Incumbent Republican United States Senator Chuck Grassley ran for re-election to a third term in the United States Senate, which he won easily against his Democratic opponent, State Senator Jean Hall Lloyd-Jones.

Democratic primary

Candidates
 Jean Hall Lloyd-Jones, Iowa State Senator
 Rosanne Freeburg

Results

Republican primary

Candidates
 Chuck Grassley, incumbent United States Senator

Results

General election

Results

See also
 1992 United States Senate elections

References

1992 Iowa elections
Iowa
1992